Coleman Hawkins Encounters Ben Webster is a studio album recorded on October 16, 1957, by Coleman Hawkins and Ben Webster, accompanied by a rhythm section led by Oscar Peterson.

In the United Kingdom, the album was released with the title Blue Saxophones.

Track listing 
"Blues for Yolande" (Coleman Hawkins) – 6:44
"It Never Entered My Mind" (Richard Rodgers, Lorenz Hart) – 5:47
"La Rosita" (Paul Dupont, Allan Stuart) – 5:02
"You'd Be So Nice to Come Home To" (Cole Porter) – 4:15
"Prisoner of Love" (Russ Columbo, Clarence Gaskill, Leo Robin) – 4:13
"Tangerine" (Johnny Mercer, Victor Schertzinger) – 5:21
"Shine On, Harvest Moon" (Jack Norworth, Nora Bayes) – 4:49

Personnel 
Coleman Hawkins – tenor saxophone
Ben Webster – tenor saxophone
Oscar Peterson – piano
Herb Ellis – guitar
Ray Brown – double bass
Alvin Stoller – drums

References

Coleman Hawkins albums
Ben Webster albums
Albums produced by Norman Granz
Verve Records albums
1959 albums